Kilnhurst F.C. was an English association football club based in Kilnhurst, South Yorkshire.

History
A home FA Cup tie with Sheffield F.C. in 1896 attracted a crowd of 2,000 to their home ground.

League and cup history

Records
Best FA Cup performance: 2nd Qualifying Round

References

Defunct football clubs in England
Defunct football clubs in South Yorkshire
Sheffield & District Football League
Sheffield Association League